Unai Uribarri Artabe (born 28 February 1984 in Mañaria, Basque Country) is a Spanish former professional road bicycle racer, who rode professionally between 2006 and 2008 for the  and  teams.

Major results

2005
 2nd Time trial, National Under-23 Road Championships

External links 
Profile at Euskaltel-Euskadi official website 

Cyclists from the Basque Country (autonomous community)
Spanish male cyclists
1984 births
Living people
People from Durangaldea
Sportspeople from Biscay